Chinese Odyssey is a 2002 Hong Kong mo lei tau musical film written and directed by Jeffrey Lau and produced by Wong Kar-wai. It stars Tony Leung Chiu-Wai, Faye Wong, Zhao Wei and Chang Chen. It is a parody of the 1959 Huangmei opera film The Kingdom and the Beauty, with virtually the same characters. It was released during the Chinese New Year, following the practice of the Hong Kong movie industry to boost comedy ticket sales during the holiday season.

Plot
The film is set in Ming Dynasty, China. Li  Yilong (Tony Leung Chiu Wai) is the town bully, known for his boorish manners and reckless attitude which have endeared him to no one, save his sister Feng (Vicki Zhao) who has a curious penchant for cross-dressing. It is apparent early on that both these siblings are such misfits they have virtually no prospect of marriage.

Faye Wong is cast as a runaway princess who is dressed as a man, a disguise which fools both Long and Feng. Long immediately decides that he likes his new-found friend so much that he will entrust his sister's hand in marriage to "him". The princess, of course, cannot marry another woman and tried to fend off Long's suggestions of a match; but also, she is attracted to Long.

Emperor Zheng De (Chang Chen) also leaves his palace temporarily to search for his missing sister. He dresses like a commoner and by a twist of fate meets Feng. He is smitten with Feng, and begins to court her, while keeping his imperial identity secret from her. His motives for leaving the palace also included the fact that he is unhappy and lonely at court and wants to escape the smothering influence of the Empress Dowager (Rebecca Pan), his mother, who plays a dictatorial role in the actions of her son.  A convoy of imperial guards try to protect him while he is out in town and bring the Emperor back to the palace, but unsuccessfully.

The Princess is also assisted by her "fairy godmother" (Athena Chu) in marrying her match. The Empress Dowager hears of her wayward children and storms Long's house, where her children are holed up, only to hear that they wish to marry two commoners with unwholesome and eccentric tendencies. The Emperor is adamant about marrying Feng and the Empress Dowager relents, but Long is unable to pass a "ring test" to prove he is the destined one and the Empress Dowager forbids his marriage to her daughter.

All ends well, however. After a separation, Long is enlightened by the "fairy godmother" and passes the "ring test". He is reunited with the Princess, the Empress Dowager accepts him, and happiness reigns.

Cast
 Tony Leung Chiu-Wai – Li Yilong, a ne'er-do-well
 Faye Wong – Princess Wushuang, the emperor's sister
 Zhao Wei – Phoenix, Li Yilong's sister
 Chang Chen – Zhengde Emperor
 Athena Chu – Amour Amour 
 Rebecca Pan – the emperor's mother
 Eric Kot – the governor / bully
 Roy Cheung – Zuo Lengshan
 Jeffrey Lau – Principal Chen, Li Yilong's former teacher
 Ning Jing – Purple Afterglow, Li Yilong's ex-girlfriend
 Jan Lamb – commentary (voice)
 Chan Lung
 Wong Wing-Ming
 Zhong Hanhao

Soundtrack
The soundtrack was a success for Faye Wong.

Track list:
 Intro [1:04]
 Out of the palace [2:30]
 Down to Jiangnan [1:59] (vocals by Zhao Wei and Chang Chen)
 Vicious mood [1:09]
 The Large World is Smaller than Dust [1:31]
 Xǐxīangféng (喜相逢; "Happy Gathering") [3:18] by Faye Wong and Tony Leung
 Morning Dew [2:35]
 Cherishing the Body [3:10]
 Zuìyīchǎng (醉一場; "A Drunk Song") [2:24] by Faye Wong and Tony Leung
 Happy Gathering Lalalalala [3:16] (vocals by Zhao Wei and Chang Chen, "lalala" version of track #6)
 Passing Glances [1:54]
 Emotional Departure [2:34]
 The Peach Flower Oath [0:36]
 Wind and Thunder on the Plains [0:31]
 Magical Power of Love [1:23]
 Fate Decided this Life [3:20]
 Drinking Alone [3:11]
 Longing before the Shadows [4:31]
 Tiānxià Wúshuāng Tiānla Dìla [2:14] by Faye Wong and Tony Leung
 Tiānxià Wúshuāng Nàgèla Xiǎngshuō Lalala [2:20] by Zhao Wei and Chang Chen (spoof of track #19)
 Here's You; Here's Me [1:35]
 The World is Great [3:10]
 Love will not Die [3:31]
 Like the Previous Dust [3:27]
 No Turning Back [2:54]
 Happy Reunion under the Spring Flowers [1:59] (vocals by Zhao Wei and Chang Chen)
 Tinha Mouseung Tinla Deila [2:15] by Faye Wong and Tony Leung (Cantonese version of track #19)

Awards
 39th Annual Golden Horse Awards
 Nomination – Best Supporting Actress (Zhao Wei)
 Nomination – Best Art Direction
 Nomination – Best Costume Design
 22nd Annual Hong Kong Film Awards:
 Nomination – Best Actress (Faye Wong)
 Nomination – Best Art Direction (Tony Au Ting-Ping)
 Nomination – Best Costume Design (William Cheung Suk Ping)
 Nomination – Best Original Film Score (Frankie Chan, Roel A. Garcia)
 9th Annual Hong Kong Film Critics Society Awards:
 Winner, Best Picture
 Winner, Best Actress (Faye Wong)

See also
 A Chinese Odyssey (Stephen Chow film)
 Hong Kong in films

References

External links
 
 
 Entry at lovehkfilm.com
 Movie website (Taiwan, in Chinese)

2002 films
2002 romantic comedy films
Hong Kong romantic comedy films
2000s Cantonese-language films
Films directed by Jeffrey Lau
Films set in 16th-century Ming dynasty
Huangmei opera films
Chinese New Year films